Manglerudhallen is the name of two arenas, an indoor ice hockey arena and a multi-purpose indoor arena, located in Manglerud, Oslo, Norway. The capacity of the ice hockey arena is 2,000 and it was opened in 1979. It is the home arena of the Manglerud Star ice hockey team.

References

External links

Sports venues in Oslo
Indoor arenas in Norway
Indoor ice hockey venues in Norway
Manglerud Star Ishockey
1979 establishments in Norway